Natalia Yuryevna Kuziutina (born 8 May 1989) is a Russian judoka who competes in the women's 52 kg category.  She won a bronze at the 2016 Summer Olympics.

Career

At the 2012 Summer Olympics, she lost her first round match against Romy Tarangul.

Four years later, in Rio at the 2016 Summer Olympics, she won a bronze medal. She beat Ecaterina Guica before losing to Misato Nakamura.  Because Nakamura reached the semi-finals, Kuziutina was entered into the repechage.  There she beat Christianne Legentil and then beat Ma Yingnan in her bronze medal match.

Palmares

2009
 Grand Slam, Paris
 Grand Slam, Moscow
2010
 Grand Slam, Moscow
2011
 Grand Slam, Moscow
2012
 Grand Prix, Düsseldorf
2013
 Grand Prix, Samsun
2014
 Grand Slam, Paris
 Grand Prix, Düsseldorf
 Grand Prix, Tbilisi
 Grand Slam, Abu Dhabi
 Grand Prix, Qingdao
2015
 IJF World Masters, Rabat
2016
 IJF World Masters, Guadalajara
2017
 Grand Slam, Paris 
 Grand Slam, Ekaterinburg 
 IJF World Masters, St. Petersburg
2018
 Grand Slam, Yekaterinburg

Mixed martial arts record

|-
|Loss
|align=center| 1–1
|Fatima Kline
|Decision (unanimous)
|Invicta FC 52: Machado vs. McCormack
|
|align=center| 3
|align=center| 5:00
|Denver, Colorado, United States
|
|-
|Win
|align=center| 1–0
|Desiree Bennett
|Submission (armbar)
|Gamebred Boxing 3
|
|align=center|1
|align=center|2:51
|Biloxi, Mississippi, United States
|

References

External links
 
 
 

1989 births
Russian female judoka
Living people
Olympic judoka of Russia
Judoka at the 2012 Summer Olympics
Judoka at the 2016 Summer Olympics
Judoka at the 2015 European Games
Judoka at the 2019 European Games
European Games medalists in judo
European Games silver medalists for Russia
European Games bronze medalists for Russia
Olympic medalists in judo
Olympic bronze medalists for Russia
Medalists at the 2016 Summer Olympics
Universiade medalists in judo
Sportspeople from Bryansk
Universiade gold medalists for Russia
Universiade bronze medalists for Russia
Medalists at the 2013 Summer Universiade
Judoka at the 2020 Summer Olympics
21st-century Russian women
Strawweight mixed martial artists
Russian female mixed martial artists
Mixed martial artists utilizing judo